Juan Camilo García Morales (born 15 June 1988) is a Colombian football midfielder.

Titles

References

1988 births
Living people
Colombian footballers
Atlético Nacional footballers
Alianza Petrolera players
Zulia F.C. players
Colombian expatriate footballers
Expatriate footballers in Venezuela
Association football midfielders
Footballers from Medellín